Pauline Marie Bremer (born 10 April 1996) is a German footballer who plays as a forward for Frauen-Bundesliga club VfL Wolfsburg and the Germany national team.

Club career

Early career
Pauline Bremer began her junior career at SVG Göttingen 07 before signing a senior contract with 1. FFC Turbine Potsdam in 2012. On 1 June 2015, it was announced that she would join Olympique Lyon for the 2015–16 season on a two-year contract.

Manchester City
Bremer joined Manchester City in 2017 as part of an exchange deal that saw defender Lucy Bronze join Olympique Lyonnais. She started her first game for Manchester on 7 October against Everton and she scored a goal in the 18th minute. However, late in the first half Bremer suffered a broken leg, which ruled her out for 13 months. She made her return for Manchester City on 5 December 2018 in a 6–0 Continental Cup win against Sheffield United. In February 2020, Manchester City announced that Bremer was to leave at the end of the 2019–20 season and return to Germany with VfL Wolfsburg.

International career
She was part of the Germany U17 team that won the 2012 UEFA Women's U-17 Championship. She managed to get the top scorer prize in the 2013 UEFA Women's U-19 Championship by scoring six goals.

She was called up to be part of the Germany U20 for the 2014 FIFA U-20 Women's World Cup. With five goals from Bremer in the tournament, the Germany team won the U-20 Women's World Cup trophy.

Bremer made her debut for the senior national team on her 18th birthday in a World Cup qualifier against Slovenia. She came on as a substitute for Célia Šašić in the 60th minute.

Bermer played in three matches for Germany during qualifying for Euro 2017, but she was not named to the final tournament roster. After missing significant time due to injury, Bremer returned to the German national team in April 2019.

Career statistics
Scores and results list Germany's goal tally first:

Source:

Honours
1. FFC Turbine Potsdam
DFB-Pokal: runner-up 2012–13, 2014–15
DFB-Hallenpokal for women: 2013, 2014

Olympique Lyon
Division 1 Féminine: 2015–16, 2016–17
Coupe de France Féminine: 2015–16, 2016–17
UEFA Women's Champions League: 2015–16, 2016–17

Manchester City
FA WSL Cup: 2018–19
FA Women's Cup: 2018–19

Germany
FIFA U-20 Women's World Cup: 2014
UEFA Women's U-17 Championship: 2012

Individual
FIFA U-20 Women's World Cup Silver Shoe: 2014
UEFA Women's U-19 Championship top scorer: 2013
Fritz Walter Medal Silver: 2014 Gold: 2015

References

External links

Profile  at DFB
Player German domestic football stats  at DFB

1996 births
Living people
1. FFC Turbine Potsdam players
German women's footballers
Germany women's international footballers
German expatriate sportspeople in France
Manchester City W.F.C. players
Expatriate women's footballers in England
2015 FIFA Women's World Cup players
Olympique Lyonnais Féminin players
Expatriate women's footballers in France
German expatriate footballers
German expatriate sportspeople in England
Women's association football midfielders
Women's association football forwards
Frauen-Bundesliga players
2. Frauen-Bundesliga players
Division 1 Féminine players
Footballers from Lower Saxony
VfL Wolfsburg (women) players